David Gans (born June 6, 1964) is a Canadian former professional ice hockey player who played for the Los Angeles Kings during the 1982–83 and the 1985–86 seasons.

Career statistics

External links
 

1964 births
Living people
Canadian ice hockey centres
Hershey Bears players
HC Ambrì-Piotta players
Ice hockey people from Ontario
Los Angeles Kings draft picks
Los Angeles Kings players
New Haven Nighthawks players
Newmarket Saints players
Oshawa Generals players
Sportspeople from Brantford
Toledo Goaldiggers players